Lago di Occhito is a lake in the Province of Foggia (Apulia) and Province of Campobasso (Molise) in the south of Italy.

Lakes of Apulia